Bailey Ice Stream is an ice stream on the northern margin of the Theron Mountains, flowing west-southwest to the Filchner Ice Shelf. It was named by the UK Antarctic Place-Names Committee after Jeremy Thomas Bailey (1941–65), a British Antarctic Survey glaciologist, who with two companions died in a crevasse accident during a radio echo sounding traverse inland from Halley Station on 12 October 1965. On an earlier traverse in April 1965, Bailey sounded the upper portion of this feature.

See also
 List of glaciers in the Antarctic
 Glaciology

References

 

Ice streams of Antarctica
Bodies of ice of Coats Land
Filchner-Ronne Ice Shelf